CABA or Caba may refer to:
Autonomous City of Buenos Aires (Ciudad Autónoma de Buenos Aires)
Chartered Accountants Benevolent Association
Compressed Air Breathing Apparatus
Continental Automated Buildings Association
Communauté d'agglomération du Bassin d'Auvergne, France
Caba, La Union, Philippines, a municipality